Fangzhuang Subdistrict is a subdistrict and residential area in northern Fengtai District. It is bounded to the north and south by the 2nd and 3rd Ring Roads, and to the west and east by Tiantan Dong Lu and Fangzhuang Dong Lu. As of 2020, it has a population of 74,999.

The subdistrict got its current name Fangzhuang due to its historical origin as an estate of Fang family.

History 
In 1951, three villages of this area (Puzhuang, Huangtuken and Yushu) merged to form the Puhuangyu Township. In 1958, it was incorporated into People's Commune of Nanyuan as Puhuangyu Production Team. Farmers left the region in 1984 as new residential areas were being constructed.

Fangzhuang was developed in 1985, and was the first "modernized" residential area of Beijing. In 2021, it lost its status as an area.

Administrative Divisions 
As of 2021, there are 16 communities within Fangzhuang Subdistrict:

Landscape 
Fangzhuang features dense concentrations of high rise apartments, along with several primary and secondary schools, hospitals, a courthouse and the Fangzhuang Sports Park.

Fangzhuang is divided into four neighborhoods: 芳古园 (Fangguyuan), 芳城园 (Fangchengyuan), 芳群园 (Fangqunyuan), 芳星园 (Fangxingyuan). The second character of each neighborhood name, taken together, spells 古城群星, which means the "stars of the ancient city." Historically, Fangzhuang was well known as an area where the affluent of southern Beijing lived (南城富人区).

Fangzhuang is served by Fangzhuang station on Line 14 of the Beijing Subway and by many city bus routes. 

Fangzhuang is home to the Ezone Sk8 Park.

References 

Fengtai District
Subdistricts of Beijing
Neighbourhoods of Beijing